Dundee Synagogue in Dundee, Scotland was the place of worship of the Tayside and Fife Jewish Community, which was established in 1878 under its former name of the Dundee Hebrew Congregation. The synagogue building, designed by Ian Imlach, was located on St Mary Place. It was opened in 1978 to replace the former synagogue building at 15 Meadow Street that was demolished in 1973.

Jews were recorded as living in Dundee in the 1840s. The community had previously met at 132 Murraygate Street and (from 1895 to 1920) at 62 Murraygate Street. The synagogue on St Mary Place was formally closed on 7 June 2019, and the base of operations for the Tayside and Fife Jewish Community moved to St Andrews.

See also
History of the Jews in Scotland
List of former synagogues in the United Kingdom
List of Jewish communities in the United Kingdom
Scottish Council of Jewish Communities

References

External links
Tayside and Fife Jewish Community
University of St. Andrews Jewish Society

1878 establishments in Scotland
2019 disestablishments in Scotland
Religion in Dundee
Religious buildings and structures in Dundee
Synagogues completed in 1978
Synagogues in Scotland